Henry Law (1797–1884) was Dean of Gloucester from 1862 until his death.

Henry Law may also refer to:
 Henry Law, 7th Baron Ellenborough (1889–1945), an officer and a member of the House of Lords
 Henry Spencer Law (1802–1885), English barrister